Melton cloth is traditionally made of wool and is woven in a twill form. It is thick, due to having been well fulled, which gives it a felt-like smooth surface. It is napped and very closely sheared. Meltons are similar to Mackinaw cloth. It is a very solid cloth in which the twill weave pattern is completely concealed due to the finishing processes. Because of its dense, quasi-felted texture it frays minimally or not at all. It is hard wearing and wind and weather resistant. Its main use is for heavy outer garments and coats and for blankets. In lighter weights melton cloth is traditionally used for lining the underside of jacket collars.

It was developed in the Leicestershire town of Melton Mowbray, from which it derives its name. This town is the traditional centre of English fox-hunting, and black and scarlet hunting coats are traditionally made from melton cloth, due to its weatherproof qualities. In England not only is melton used for the scarlet hunting coat, an iconic symbol of the upper-class elite, but it is also used in black for the donkey jacket, an iconic symbol of the working class labouring man. Both uses rely on its weatherproof qualities.

Melton cloth is also used as the covering for real tennis balls.

Queen Victoria commissioned curtains made of Melton  cloth  for Windsor Castle, the  curtains being made by the Leeds textile manufacturing firm William  Lupton  and Co.

Admiralty cloth 
It was a cloth used for British naval officers. It was a term for standard melton used for officer's uniform such as coats, and jackets etc.

References

Woven fabrics
Waulked textiles